Nicky Allt (born 12 December 1960, Liverpool, Merseyside, England) is an English playwright, Author and Filmmaker.

Early life
Allt is an eldest child from a family of five; his father, Christopher worked as a union shop steward in a number of factories and his mother, Rose as a union rep, dinner lady. After being slum-cleared from Liverpool city centre to Kirkby in 1965, from 1965-72, he went to St. Mary's Roman Catholic Infant and Junior Schools in Kirkby. From 1972 onward, he attended St Kevin's Comprehensive in Kirkby till 1977 (which became All Saints Catholic High School, Kirkby). He has lived a nomadic lifestyle, emigrating to South Africa and America, and living and working, at various building trades, in London, Jersey, Bournemouth, Germany and Spain, and numerous other cities around the globe.

Career
His first success came as the writer of The Boys from the Mersey, a bestselling book about his travels while following Liverpool Football Club. His next book, Here We Go Gathering Cups in May was written with six other authors about Liverpool FC's seven European Cup Final appearances.

Allt's first play, "Brick Up the Mersey Tunnels", co-written, became a huge local hit at Liverpool's Royal Court Theatre. The play, about a comedic rivalry between The Wirral and Liverpool, which ends in the surreal blockading of the Mersey Tunnels, to stop the 'posh Wirraliens' from getting through to take up Liverpool jobs, was eventually watched by over 180,000 people.
In Liverpool Theatre folklore, it was stated that it saved the historic Royal Court Theatre from closing. The play went on to complete four sell-out runs at the Theatre.

Allt's next venture into theatre was to write and produce the hit show, "One Night in Istanbul", which became The Empire Theatre's fastest selling show, after being watched by 25,000 people in a short run in the spring of 2009. The show had repeated success at The Liverpool Empire, and at the brand new Grand Canal Theatre in Dublin's docklands. It is now being made into a movie.

Allt's first Independent feature film "One Night in Istanbul" starring Sam Janus, Paul Barber and Steve Waddington will be released in 2014, along with a new comedy play
"A Tale of Two Chippy's" about two warring North West fish and chip shops, and a new movie about ex Prime Minister Mrs Margaret Thatcher.

Allt lives in Liverpool with his wife and three children and has written and produced an official show about the history of
Liverpool Football Club called You'll Never Walk Alone that received rave reviews, and is in the process of writing a movie about New York and Ireland.

He is also the author of huge hit show "Celtic the Musical" which sold out at Glasgow's Pavilion Theatre in 2016 and 2018 and will play The Armadillo in September 2022.

You'll Never Walk Alone received an excellent reception and reviews in Liverpool Echo, Daily Post, Liverpool Confidential, Liverpool Student Media and The Public Reviews

Brick Up the Mersey Tunnels, Celtic the Musical, You’ll Never Walk Alone and One Night in Istanbul have all proven very popular with audiences and Allt has now been commissioned to write a new movie and show to be announced in 2022.

Works

Plays
 Brick Up the Mersey Tunnels, Royal Court Theatre, Liverpool, England, 2006-2016
 One Night in Istanbul, Empire Theatre, Liverpool, England, 9 July 2009
 You’ll Never Walk Alone – The History of Liverpool F.C., Royal Court, Liverpool 2011, 2014, 2017
 A Tale of Two Chippy's, Royal Court 2014.
 Celtic the Musical 2016
 Celebrate 67 Hydro 2017
 Brick Up 2. The Wrath of Ann Twacky
 Lost in Colomendy Royal Court 2020
 The Sunderland Story Sunderland Empire 2023

Films 
 One Night in Istanbul, starring Paul Barber, Samantha Janus, Steve Waddington, released in September 2014 to critical acclaim. Allt's next movie is underway as is his next play, both written for Ireland.

Bibliography

http://www.press.uchicago.edu/presssite/metadata.epl?mode=synopsis&bookkey=6305087

References

External links
"Brick Up: The Wirral Strikes Back", NWtheatre

1960 births
Living people
People from Kirkby
English male dramatists and playwrights
English filmmakers